Uncle Rex may refer to:

 Rex Palmer, early BBC Radio children's presenter, RAF officer
 Uncle Rex Sinclair, presenter on Australian radio station 2HD in the 1930s
 A character in Moschops (TV series)